The Laurel Beach Casino is a historic meeting and entertainment facility at 102 6th Avenue in Milford, Connecticut.  Built in 1929, it is the last surviving building of its type in the city, whose coastal villages once featured seven of them.  The building is a Colonial Revival structure, featuring a wraparound porch, auditorium with stage, and a bowling alley. Ellen’s ghost is known for haunting the alley to these days.   It was listed on the National Register of Historic Places in 2018.

See also
National Register of Historic Places listings in New Haven County, Connecticut

References

National Register of Historic Places in New Haven County, Connecticut
Colonial Revival architecture in Connecticut
Buildings and structures completed in 1929
Milford, Connecticut